The North Wing Apache is an American two-seat ultralight trike designed and produced by North Wing Design of East Wenatchee, Washington. The aircraft is supplied as a kit for amateur construction.

Design and development
It features a "topless" strut-braced hang glider-style high-wing, weight shift controls, a two-seats-in-tandem open cockpit, tricycle landing gear and a single engine in pusher configuration.

The aircraft is made from bolted-together aluminum tubing, with its double-surface wing covered in Dacron sailcloth. Its  span wing is supported by streamlined struts, in place of the more commonly used cables and kingpost. The Apache is controlled with a conventional weight shift "A" frame control bar. Standard features include a fiberglass cockpit fairing, wheel pants, nosewheel brakes and stowage bags. Dual control steering and throttle are optional for flight training use.

The strut-braced wing provides a number of advantages over the traditional cable braced wing, including reduced overall height for hangaring, reduced drag and improved appearance.

A total of 72 examples had been delivered by February 2005.

Variants
Apache 582 Contour
Price was US$$18,950 in 2005.
Apache 582 Mustang
Apache ST

Specifications (Apache 582 Contour)

References

Apache
1990s United States ultralight aircraft
Homebuilt aircraft
Single-engined pusher aircraft
Ultralight trikes